Tatiana Idonea (19 April 1924 – 31 January 2022), better known by the stage name of Tatiana Farnese, was an Italian actress. She died in Rome on 31 January 2022, at the age of 97.

Filmography
Schoolgirl Diary (1941)
A Garibaldian in the Convent (1942)
The Gorgon (1942)
 The Woman of Sin (1942)
 (1943)
The Mad Marechiaro (1952)
 (1991)
 (1994)
Your Whole Life Ahead of You (2008)
Three Days Later (2013)

References

1924 births
2022 deaths
Italian film actresses
Italian radio actors
Italian stage actresses
Italian television actresses
Actresses from Rome